Linda Wejcman (December 9, 1939 – February 22, 2010) was an American politician who served as a member of the Minnesota House of Representatives from 1991 to 2000.

Background 
Born in Spencer, Iowa, Wejcman attended Iowa State University. She moved to Minneapolis, Minnesota in 1972 and was a consultant and community activist. Wejcman served in the Minnesota House of Representatives as a Democrat from 1991 to 2000, She died of leukemia in Minneapolis, Minnesota.

References

1938 births
2010 deaths
People from Spencer, Iowa
Politicians from Minneapolis
Iowa State University alumni
Women state legislators in Minnesota
Democratic Party members of the Minnesota House of Representatives
Deaths from leukemia
Deaths from cancer in Minnesota
21st-century American women